Edward River may refer to:

 Edward River, a branch of the Murray River in south western New South Wales, Australia
 Edward River (Queensland), a river in Queensland, Australia
 Edward River, Queensland, a locality in the Shire of Cook, Queensland, Australia

See also 
 Edward (disambiguation)
 Edwards River (disambiguation)